Michael Tidser (born 15 January 1990) is a Scottish footballer who plays as a midfielder for Kelty Hearts.

Tidser began his career with Celtic, before spending a short spell in Sweden with Östersunds FK. Tidser then returned to Scotland to spend three seasons at Greenock Morton, where he made well over 100 appearances. Tidser then moved to English club Rotherham United. After spells on loan with Ross County and Oldham Athletic, Tidser returned to Morton in 2015. After leaving Morton in 2019 he had a short spell with Falkirk.

He is a former Scotland U19 international and features in the 2012–13 First Division team of the year as Morton finished second in the league.

Club career
Born in Glasgow, Tidser started his career with Celtic and was captain of the Under 19's before being released. He then signed a short-term contract with Swedish side Östersunds FK.

Morton
After his contract expired with Östersunds, he signed an 18-month deal with Greenock Morton.

Tidser would make an impressive start for the club, which resulted winning Young Player of the Month for March 2010 and has been watched by Rangers coach Kenny McDowall.

In 2010/11 season, Tidser scored his first goal for the club, in a 2–0 win over Partick Thistle. His impressive performance continued with Scottish Premier League's Kilmarnock and League One side Huddersfield Town, but no avail. Then, on 12 February 2011, Tidser then sent off after a second bookable offence, in a 1–0 loss against Falkirk. After the match, Manager Allan Moore said he was disappointed with Tidser's action. In April 2011, Tidser signed a new three-year deal with Morton.

In 2011/12 season, Tidser started the season well, scoring his first goal of the season, before providing an assist for Peter MacDonald to score a winning goal, in a 2–1 win over Livingston on 13 August 2011. A week later, on 23 August 2011, he scored again and setting up a goal for MacDonald, in the second round of the Scottish League Cup, in a 4–3 loss against St Mirren. However, his early season was overshadowed with a knee problem. Following an operation, it was  announced that he will be out for two-months, he was expected to come back in December. Soon in mid-November, Tidser resumed training. Upon recovering from injury, Tidser spoke to the Greenock Telegraph describing his sidelined from injury as "torture" and hard to make a return. In January 2012, after Stuart McCaffrey was ruled out for the season, Tidser was made Morton's team captain just after his 22nd birthday. On 20 March 2012, he scored his second goal of the season, in a 2–0 win over Falkirk.

In 2012–13 season, Tidser had a good season with the club, having made a good display to compete with Partick Thistle to get promoted to Scottish Premier League, which Morton finished second. On 6 October 2012 Tidser provided a double assist for Kevin Rutkiewicz and Mark McLaughlin, in a 3–1 win over Partick. It wasn't until 29 December 2012 when Tidser scored twice, in a 4–2 win over Dunfermline Athletic. That was followed up on 26 January 2013 when he scored in a 1–0 win over Raith Rovers. His next goal came on 23 February 2013 when he, again, scored against Dunfermline Athletic, with the same result on 29 December 2012. On 16 March 2013, Tidser scored his final goal of the season, in a 3–0 win over Dumbarton. During the season, he also made a good display by making assists. He also scored five times in the Scottish Cup, including a brace against Albion Rovers and Turriff United, which was scored in the Scottish Cup replay. However, Tidser suffered a groin injury, that ruled him out for the rest of the season.

After a great season, Tidser was nominated for the 2012–13 First Division Player of the Year. It got better for Tidser when he won the supporters' club awards. In June 2013, Tidser was the subject of a £50k bid from Rotherham United, which was rejected by Morton chairman Douglas Rae at first. Soon the bid was made again, but this time it was accepted five days later.

Rotherham United
Tidser officially signed for Rotherham United on 3 July 2013. The following week, on 9 July 2013, Tidser played against his former club Morton; when brought on, as a late substitute, he was given a standing ovation by Morton's fans.

After featuring on the bench in the first two matches of the opening game of the 2013–14 season, Tidser finally made his debut after coming on as a late substitute in a 2–1 win over Crawley Town. However his start at Rotherham United didn't go as planned for him as his appearances had "mostly have been off the bench".

On 3 January 2014, Tidser joined Ross County on loan until the end of the 2013–14 season, in order to help the club retain their Scottish Premiership status next season. Tidser made his Ross County debut the next day, coming on as a substitute in the second half, in a 1–0 win over St Johnstone. Tidser's playing time increased, playing in midfielder position and assisted twice in two games against Hibernian on 15 February 2014 and St Mirren on 22 February 2014. However, his knee injury put Tidser out for the remainder of the season. Tidser made 16 appearances for Ross County and returned to his parent club at the end of the season.

After making his return to Rotherham United, Tidser made his first appearance in a year for the club, in a 1–0 win over Fleetwood Town in the first round of the League Cup. Tidser made two more appearances for the club, against Watford in the league and another League Cup appearance against Swansea City. But on 1 September 2014, in the last hour of Deadline Day, Tidser signed for Oldham Athletic on loan until January 2015. Tidser made his Oldham Athletic debut in the second round of Football League Trophy, which they beat Barnsley 4–2 on penalty shoot-out. However, Tidser struggled for the first team at the club and made seven appearances in all competitions.

He was released in January 2015 after two years at Rotherham United, and was quickly on the radar of former club Morton.

Return to Morton

In January 2015, Tidser returned to Morton on a two-and-a-half-year deal. He was unable, however, to play until the 2015–16 season due to FIFA transfer regulations. Because of this, Tidser played in the club's reserve matches, in order to maintain his fitness throughout the season.

His 2015–16 season with Morton was limited to very few appearances before finally being ruled out all together in March after suffering a suspected hernia.

In June 2017, Tidser signed a two-year extension with the club.

International career
Tidser made three appearances for both the Scotland under-18 and under-19 sides, scoring once for the under-18's against Turkey.

Career statistics

Honours

Club
Kelty Hearts
Lowland League: 2019–20, 2020–21

Individual
Greenock Morton
SFL Young Player of the Month – March 2010
First Division Player of the Year nominee – 2012–13
First Division Team of the Year – 2012–13

References

External links

1990 births
Association football midfielders
Celtic F.C. players
English Football League players
Expatriate footballers in Sweden
Greenock Morton F.C. players
Living people
Oldham Athletic A.F.C. players
Östersunds FK players
Ross County F.C. players
Rotherham United F.C. players
Scottish expatriate footballers
Scottish expatriate sportspeople in Sweden
Scottish Football League players
Scottish footballers
Scotland youth international footballers
Footballers from Glasgow
Falkirk F.C. players
Kelty Hearts F.C. players
Lowland Football League players